Janou Levels (born 30 October 2000) is a Dutch footballer, who plays for PSV and the national team.

Club career
Levels started playing football at the age of five for SHH Herten.

In April 2018, Levels signed for PSV ahead of the 2018–19 Eredivisie. She was part of the PSV team that lost the 2020 Eredivisie Cup Final to FC Twente. In April 2020, she signed a new contract with PSV, and in April 2021, she signed a new three-year contract with the club. In the 2020–21 KNVB Women's Cup Final against ADO Den Haag, Janou conceded a penalty for handball after complaining to the referee about an opponent for the same offence. PSV won the match 1–0, and it was their first major honour.

International career
In October 2021, Levels was first selected for the Netherlands women's national football team. The next month, she made her senior debut in a match against Japan. She was in the Dutch squad for three matches in February 2022.

Personal life
Levels is from Herten, Netherlands. She is the daughter of Jo Levels, who played for VVV-Venlo. In March 2021, Levels tested positive for COVID-19.

References

External links

2000 births
Living people
Dutch women's footballers
Netherlands women's international footballers
Footballers from Limburg (Netherlands)
PSV (women) players
Women's association football defenders
People from Roermond
21st-century Dutch women